Scissurella rota is a species of minute sea snail, a marine gastropod mollusk or micromollusk in the family Scissurellidae, the little slit snails.

Description
The size of the shell varies between 1.3 mm and 1.9 mm.

Distribution
This marine species occurs in the Red Sea and off the East Cape Province, South Africa.

Diet 
Members of this species feed primarily on algae or detritus.

Habitat 
Typically found in the benthic zone of a body of water.

References

 Geiger, D.L. (2012). Monograph of the little slit shells. Volume 1. Introduction, Scissurellidae. pp. 1-728. Volume 2. Anatomidae, Larocheidae, Depressizonidae, Sutilizonidae, Temnocinclidae. pp. 729-1291. Santa Barbara Museum of Natural History Monographs. Number 7.

External links
 To Encyclopedia of Life
 To USNM Invertebrate Zoology Mollusca Collection
 To World Register of Marine Species
 
 Yaron, I. (1983). A review of the Scissurellidae (Mollusca: Gastropoda) of the Red Sea. Annalen des Naturhistorischen Museums in Wien. Serie B für Botanik und Zoologie. 84: 263-279
 Herbert D.G. (2015). An annotated catalogue and bibliography of the taxonomy, synonymy and distribution of the Recent Vetigastropoda of South Africa (Mollusca). Zootaxa. 4049(1): 1-98

Scissurellidae
Gastropods described in 1983